Spanish Springs High School is a public secondary school in unincorporated Washoe County serving students living in Spanish Springs and Sparks, Nevada, part of the Washoe County School District; it is one of three public high schools serving the city of Sparks.

JROTC

Spanish Springs High School features one of the top Army Junior Reserve Officers' Training Corps programs in the United States. In the 2013/2014 school year the program was designated an "Honor Unit with Distinction" for the thirteenth consecutive year.

Notable alumni
 Jake Dalton, former gymnast

References

External links 
 Official site

Public high schools in Nevada
Educational institutions established in 2001
Washoe County School District
Buildings and structures in Sparks, Nevada
Schools in Washoe County, Nevada
2001 establishments in Nevada